In Buenos Aires, Argentina, a couple of lovers of dark and psychedelic rock and punk came together in 1998 to form Capsula, a band with a unique sound that blended garage, glam, and punk rock. Their name, which means "capsule" in Spanish, is derived from the David Bowie song "Space Oddity".

Despite not having released an album yet, they played shows in clubs across Europe, showcasing their raw and energetic live performances. As they continued to develop their sound, Capsula caught the attention of legendary producer Tony Visconti, known for his work with David Bowie and T. Rex. Visconti was impressed with their music and agreed to produce their album "Solar Secrets" in 2013. The album was a critical success, with Rolling Stone magazine describing it as "garage-glam heaven on a platter." Capsula's sound was praised as "a dynamic compression of The Who, The Cramps, and Sonic Youth in a high tide of psychedelia," by David Fricke. The band's reputation grew quickly, and they became known for their intense live performances and unique sound.

Capsula's success continued as they toured relentlessly across Europe, the United States and South America, playing shows with bands like Iggy Pop, Os Mutantes, and Pearl Jam and developing a devoted fan base along the way. They continued to push the boundaries of their music, experimenting with new sounds and influences.

Today, Capsula is widely regarded as one of the most innovative and influential rock bands of their generation, with a career that spans over two decades and countless live performances and recordings. Their music has been praised by critics and fans alike, and their influence can be heard in the work of other artists.

History

1997–2006: South America, Bilbao, road and "Songs & Circuits" 
Capsula self-released their debut album, "Sublime," in 1999, followed by "Yudoka" in 2000, which showcased their unique blend of alternative rock, lo-fi, experimental, and psychedelic rock genres. After moving to Bilbao, Capsula continued to experiment with their songwriting process, employing surrealist automatism and cut-up techniques for their self-titled album "Capsula," which was released in 2002. The album was published and distributed by the independent record label DDT diskak from Bilbao and was characterized by its alternative rock, experimental, and psychedelic rock sounds. To promote the album, the band played intimate acoustic performances at libraries and on radio shows starting in 2003.

In 2005, Capsula began recording their album "Songs & Circuits," which was eventually published by the Madrid-based label Discos Liliput. This album showcased a mix of garage rock, pop rock, indie rock, psychedelic rock, and glam, and was distributed worldwide by the label Northern Star Records. It was described as "garage rock for the 21st Century." The album hinted at the feeling of being in the presence of a truly great group. Capsula embarked on an extensive tour in support of the album, playing 110 shows across the USA, Canada, Europe, and South America, and received rave reviews for their electrifying live performances.

Capsula's musical influences, including The Velvet Underground, The Stooges, early David Bowie, and Television, turn their acclaimed live performances into true explosions of sweat and adrenaline. 

Since then, Capsula has toured extensively across three continents, including five tours in the United Kingdom, France, Germany (where their brilliant participation in the Popkomm 08 festival made them known and led to them being invited to be part of the BCore stable), Ireland, the Netherlands, Belgium, Portugal, South America, and a tour of the United States (including a celebrated performance at the SXSW festival in Texas).

BCore Disc, SXSW, 2007–2011 
After their debut album "Songs & Circuits" (Liliput, 07), Capsula signed with Barcelona-based independent record label BCore Disc in October 2008 and released their album "Rising Mountains" in April 2009. The album only confirmed what their debut hinted at, with Rolling Stone's David Fricke hailing them as one of the best surprises at the 2009 South by Southwest (SXSW) festival. The band toured extensively in support of the album, playing 54 shows across Europe, the USA, and South America.

Capsula's live set is not limited to music but also includes visuals and a technological display, making them a unique case of futuristic garage-rock. They even collaborated with New York City rock legend Ivan Julian (Richard Hell & The Voidoids) to record a new album titled "The Naked Flame," released in Spain by Bloody Hotsak in July 2009.

In 2011, Capsula released "In The Land of Silver Souls," produced by John Agnello. The album was promoted with a tour in the United States, playing 39 shows including KEXP Concerts At The Mural in Seattle Amphitheatre and City Arts Festival. The band also toured South America, playing shows in Colombia, Argentina, Chile, and Uruguay. Capsula's reputation as a group that puts emphasis on attitude, a way of life, a passion for their music beyond trends, and a devotion to doing their work well with the urgency of those who want to live fast and explore all corners before it's too late.

2012 – 2018, Bowie, Visconti, Psychedelia, Pearl Jam, Science-fiction and Surrealism 

In 2012, Capsula went back to the studio to record a personal reinterpretation of David Bowie's classic album "The Rise and Fall of Ziggy Stardust and the Spiders from Mars" with producer John Agnello. The process of recording the album was documented in a film called "Dreaming Of Ziggy Stardust," which was presented at the Official Section of the Music Documentary Film Festival in San Sebastián, Dock of the Bay. The album was described as "more than simple curiosity, a contemporary approach to the album. A bit more lo-fi, garage. A bit dirtier. Equally rocking."

In 2013, Capsula recorded a new album titled "Solar Secrets," produced by legendary producer Tony Visconti, who had just completed David Bowie's powerful comeback album "The Next Day." The album was originally inspired by Argentine painter Xul Solar, and included the songs "Constellation Freedom," "Seven Crimes," and "Trails of Senselessness." The album received great reviews, with Rolling Stone magazine and the Chicago Tribune premiering the song "Blind." Critics described the album as "garage-glam heaven on a platter" and "a dynamic compression of the Who, the Cramps, and Sonic Youth in a high tide of psychedelia."

Capsula performed 53 shows in the United States, touring with influential Brazilian psychedelic rock band Os Mutantes, and 57 shows in Europe. They played at Austin Psych Fest 2013, where The Austin Chronicle described their show as "a fabulous gilded snake, writhing on a big stage while plying seismic garage rock." Capsula also opened for L.A. punk band X in December 2013, with singer, artist, and poet Exene Cervenka expressing her admiration for the band.

Capsula appeared at several music festivals, including SXSW from 2008 to 2012, San Sebastian Jazz Festival in 2013, Día De La Musica Festival in Madrid in 2013, Nox Orae in Vevey, Switzerland in 2013, Sonorama Festival in Burgos in 2013, DCode Festival in Madrid in 2012, Primavera Sound in Barcelona in 2011, Bilbao BBK Live in 2010, Low Cost Festival in Benidorm in 2011, Nrmal Festival in Monterrey, Mexico in 2010, Decibelle (formerly Estrojam) in Chicago in 2010, and Incubate (formerly ZXZW) in Tilburg, Netherlands in 2008 among others. In November 2015, they opened for Pearl Jam in Argentina at Estadio Único de La Plata.

n 2016, Capsula recorded "Santa Rosa," an album heavily influenced by surrealism, The Cramps, Dead Kennedys and science fiction. The band played 110 shows in 220 days across 93 cities while promoting the album. The album was mastered in Argentina by Eduardo Bergallo and released by the Basque label Gaztelupeko Hotsak in Spain and the independent label from the city of Bordeaux, Vicious Circle, in France.

2019: The era of Bestiarium: Beasts and Exquisite corpse with algorithms 
In 2018, Capsula began writing a new album titled Bestiarium, which was inspired by antique bestiaries as well as the 1962 Jean Cocteau film in which he asks whether humans in the 2000s have become robots. The album "Bestiarium" is Capsula's personal answer to that curious and accurate question. Each song on "Bestiarium" features a creature that is a unique blend of human, animal, and divine characteristics. Capsula imagines these beings as representing the cyborgs of the future, exploring themes of identity and transformation in a rapidly evolving world.

The album was created using a combination of surrealistic cut-up techniques with algorithms, which enabled the band to experiment with new sounds and push the boundaries of their music. "Bestiarium" was released in 2019 and received critical acclaim for its innovative approach to rock music.

Recorded at Silver Recordings, the songs of this album have a noir spirit. The first singles are 'Sirens's Lips', 'Cry With You' and a version of the band The Lords of The New Church's 'Russian Roulette'.

The album is published on March 22 of 2019. Barcelona's magazine Ruta 66 describes "Bestiarium" as 'A dark retrofuturist and punk paradise' and the musical publication MondoSonoro as a 'Devilish and exciting artifact' 8/10.

2021: Phantasmaville, empty cities, Ciudad Fantasma! 
"Phantasmaville," released in 2021 and published by Capsula's label Silver Recordings, features a unique combination of psychedelic, post-punk, and Latin sounds, with pulsating rhythms and raw, energetic guitar riffs. Capsula accompanied the release of "Phantasmaville" with a tour of 54 concerts throughout Spain, France, Chile, Uruguay, Argentina, and the United States.

In 2021, Capsula's album "Phantasmaville" was voted the second-best national album by the rock n roll magazine Ruta 66. It was also included in the Top 5 list for November 2021 by the radio station KEXP.

According to rock journalist Ignacio Julià, "In 'Phantasmaville,' they maintain and amplify their psycho-glam-rocker vocation, oblivious to the trends and flavors that dominate popular music of the new millennium." - Ignacio Julià (Ruta 66).

Influences
Capsula covered "I Need Somebody" and "Gimme Danger" by Iggy Pop & The Stooges, the album The Rise and Fall of Ziggy Stardust and the Spiders from Mars by David Bowie, "Run Run Run" by The Velvet Underground, "Planet Caravan" by Black Sabbath, "I Wanna Be Your Boyfriend" by The Ramones, "Color Humano" by Almendra, "Mejor No Hablar de Ciertas Cosas" by Sumo, "Imágenes Paganas" by Virus and "Russian Roulette" by The Lords of The New Church.

Discography

Studio albums 

Sublime 1999. La Nena Records, Hotsak
Yudoka 2000. La Nena Records, Hotsak
Ultimo Fragmento 2000. La Nena Records
Capsula 2002. DDT diskak
Songs & Circuits 2006. Discos Liliput, Devil In Her Heart
Rising Mountains 2009. BCore Disc
Ivan Julian & Capsula – The Naked Flame 2009. Bloody Hotsak, 02:59 Records
In The Land Of Silver Souls 2011. Krian Music Group, BCore Disc
Dreaming Of Ziggy Stardust 2012. Hotsak.
Solar Secrets 2013. Krian Music Group
Santa Rosa 2016. Silver Recordings, Vicious Circle and Hotsak.
Bestiarium 2019. Vicious Circle, Dynamo Tapes, Silver Recordings, Hotsak.
Phantasmaville 2021. Silver Recordings, Adrenalinfix Music, After Before, Head Records.

Live albums

Dead Or Alive 2014. Hotsak, Krian Music Group

Compilation CD albums

"Voices Underground". Bands on Tour Compilation. 2005. Ria Records
"A boy through airwaves" Bendito Pop. Junk Records. 2006
"Found & Lost" This Is The New Bcore Sampler For 2009. 2009. B-Core
"Found & Lost" Psychedelica 4. 2010. Northern Star Records
"In The Land Of Silver Souls" Bcore Disc Sampler 2010. 2010. B-Core
"Magnetic Brain" Live At KEXP Volume Seven. 2011. KEXP
"Under The Woods" À Découvrir Absolument Vol 24. 2011. À Découvrir Absolument
"Hit 'n' Miss" Bigotes, Bombines y Decibelios Vol. 1. 2011. Señor López Discos
"Hit 'n' Miss" Bcore Disc Sampler 2012. 2012. B-Core

Singles

"Imagenes Paganas" 2001. Virus Tribute. White Label
"From the Sun" 2004. White Label
"Shshout" 2005. White Label
"Run Run Run" The Velvet Underground Tribute. 2007. Green Light / Electric Mountain
Siren's Lips 2018. Silver Recordings, Hotsak

Filmography 
2014 – Dreaming Of Ziggy Stardust

References

External links 
 Official site
 Capsula discography Capsula at Discogs
Capsula at Spotify
Capsula at MusicBrainz

Argentine rock music groups
Argentine alternative rock groups
Argentine indie rock groups
Argentine psychedelic rock music groups
Garage rock groups
Argentine post-punk music groups
Garage punk groups